A clinical terminology server is a terminology server, which contains and provides access to clinical terminology.

Background 
The first generic description of general terminology servers per se was produced by the
European GALEN Project. Rector et al. outline the functional attributes of the GALEN terminology server.

A clinical terminology server provides the following services to client applications:
 management of external references
 management of internal representations
 mapping natural language to concepts and vv
 mapping concepts to medical classification schemes
 management of extrinsic information

The main purpose of a clinical terminology server is to allow the consistent and comparable entry of clinical data, e.g. patient observations, findings and events.

References 
 
 CG Chute, PL Elkin, DD Sherertz, MS Tuttle, (1999), Desiderata for a Clinical Terminology Server

Health informatics